

402001–402100 

|-bgcolor=#f2f2f2
| colspan=4 align=center | 
|}

402101–402200 

|-bgcolor=#f2f2f2
| colspan=4 align=center | 
|}

402201–402300 

|-bgcolor=#f2f2f2
| colspan=4 align=center | 
|}

402301–402400 

|-bgcolor=#f2f2f2
| colspan=4 align=center | 
|}

402401–402500 

|-bgcolor=#f2f2f2
| colspan=4 align=center | 
|}

402501–402600 

|-bgcolor=#f2f2f2
| colspan=4 align=center | 
|}

402601–402700 

|-bgcolor=#f2f2f2
| colspan=4 align=center | 
|}

402701–402800 

|-bgcolor=#f2f2f2
| colspan=4 align=center | 
|}

402801–402900 

|-bgcolor=#f2f2f2
| colspan=4 align=center | 
|}

402901–403000 

|-id=920
| 402920 Tsawout ||  || The Tsawout First Nation, who live on Vancouver Island on the west coast of Canada. || 
|}

References 

402001-403000